Sen Sōshu (千宗守) is the hereditary name of the head of the Mushakōjisenke school of Japanese tea ceremony, whose founder was the 16th century tea master, Sen no Rikyū.

Chadō